Richard Litelcote (fl. 1416), of Wiltshire, was an English politician.

He was a Member (MP) of the Parliament of England for Devizes in March 1416.

References

14th-century births
15th-century deaths
English MPs March 1416
People from Wiltshire